Koen Naert (born 3 September 1989 in Roeselare) is a Belgian athlete who specializes in cross-country and long-distance running.

Naert finished seventh at the 2015 Berlin Marathon and 13th at the 2015 Hamburg Marathon. In 2018, he won the gold medal in the marathon at the European Athletics Championships in Berlin with 2:09:51 for a championship record. His personal best of 2:07:39 comes from the 2019 Rotterdam Marathon, where he placed seventh.

In 2020, he competed in the men's race at the 2020 World Athletics Half Marathon Championships held in Gdynia, Poland.

He qualified to represent Belgium at the 2020 Summer Olympics and finished in 10th place.

References

External links
 
 
 
 

Living people
Belgian male long-distance runners
1989 births
People from Roeselare
European Athletics Championships winners
Olympic athletes of Belgium
Athletes (track and field) at the 2016 Summer Olympics
Athletes (track and field) at the 2020 Summer Olympics
Sportspeople from West Flanders